The Lublin Voivodeship Sejmik is the regional legislature of the Voivodeship of Lublin in Poland. It is a unicameral parliamentary body consisting of thirty-three councillors chosen during regional elections for a five-year term. The current chairperson of the assembly is Michał Mulawa.

The assembly elects the executive board that acts as the collective executive for the provincial government, headed by the voivodeship marshal. The current Executive Board of Lublin is held by the Law and Justice party under the leadership of Marshal Jarosław Stawiarski.

The assembly meets within the Marshal's Office in the capital city of Lublin.

Districts 

Members of the Assembly are elected from five districts and serve five-year terms. Districts does not have the constituencies formal names. Instead, each constituency has a number and territorial description.

See also 
 Polish Regional Assembly
 Lublin Voivodeship

References

External links 
 Lublin Regional Assembly
 Executive Board of Lublin

Lublin
Assembly
Unicameral legislatures